Adolf von Rauch may refer to:

Adolf von Rauch (born 1798), German paper manufacturer
Adolf von Rauch (born 1805), German cavalry officer